Florence Granjus (born 17 May 1962) is a French politician representing La République En Marche. She was elected to the French National Assembly on 18 June 2017, representing the Yvelines's 12th constituency.

Biography 
On 18 June 2017, during the second round of the legislative elections, she came first against David Douillet with 56.63% of the votes cast. Before getting elected to the French National Assembly, Florence Granjus worked in the employment sector at the ANPE and later at Pôle emploi.

Granjus has been an advocate for gender equality. In November 2017 she launched a contest between primary schools in her constituency, the subject being equality between boys and girls. Her most significant political commitment being employment, she is quoted saying that it "is the identity of an individual".

She dismissed her two parliamentary staff in June 2018. They file a complaint against her for harassment.

See also 
 2017 French legislative election

References 

Deputies of the 15th National Assembly of the French Fifth Republic
La République En Marche! politicians
21st-century French women politicians
1962 births
Living people
Members of Parliament for Yvelines
Women members of the National Assembly (France)